Hollywood Theatre Row  is the official name for the district of Hollywood, California bounded roughly by McCadden Place and El Centro Ave and Lexington and Melrose Avenues, consisting of approximately 22 stages.

On June 1, 2015, City Councilmembers Mitch O'Farrell (CD13) and Tom LaBonge (CD4) along with actor French Stewart, The Blank Theatre Artistic Director Daniel Henning and several hundred community members unveiled the City of Los Angeles signage that officially created Hollywood Theatre Row as a "Live Theatre District."

It is also the core home of the Hollywood Fringe Festival each June, bringing thousands of audience members to Hollywood Theatre Row to see nearly 400 productions each year.

Venues
McCadden Place Theatre 1157 N McCadden Pl
The Lex Theatre 6760 Lexington Ave
The Village at Ed Gould Plaza  1125 N McCadden Pl
National Comedy Theatre  733 Seward St
Hudson Theatres  6539 Santa Monica Blvd
The Blank’s 2nd Stage Theatre  6500 Santa Monica Blvd
The Complex Theatres  6476 Santa Monica Blvd
Studio C Artists  6448 Santa Monica Blvd
Theatre Asylum  6320 Santa Monica Blvd
Sacred Fools Theater Company  1076 Lillian Way
The Lounge Theatre  6201 Santa Monica Blvd
El Centro Theatre  804 N. El Centro Ave  - currently under renovation

Geography of Los Angeles